US Naval Base Solomons was a number of United States Navy bases in the Solomon Islands in the Pacific Ocean. Most were built by the US Navy Seabees, Naval Construction Battalions, during World War II as part of the Pacific War. In August 1942 the United States Armed Forces took the Guadalcanal in the Solomon, in the Battle of Guadalcanal. US Navy Seabees built a new base at Guadalcanal, Naval Base Guadalcanal and then on other islands in the Solomons.

Naval Base Guadalcanal 
One of the major activities of the Naval Base Guadalcanal was the support of the building of the airbase Henderson Field.  The first aircraft landed on Henderson Field on August 12, 1942. Naval Base Guadalcanal also supported the many troops on Guadalcanal and staging for coming actions. The seas off Naval Base Guadalcanal, Savo Sound, were nicknamed Ironbottom Sound due to the many ships and planes sunk off Guadalcanal, in the battle, codenamed Operation Watchtower. On 28 July 1942, the US Navy and US Marine did a practice amphibious landing at Naval Base Fiji's Koro Island. This landing was to prepare the troops for the upcoming landings at Guadalcanal, the Troop's first major offensive of the War. From the rehearsal, lessons were learned that helped at Guadalcanal. On 31 July 1942, the Troops departed Fiji for the invasion of Guadalcanal. The invasion of Guadalcanal being the first did not have the later advancements in amphibious warfare like the landing ships: Landing Ship, Tanks or Landing craft tanks. Supplies were taken from cargo holds of ships and loaded onto small landing craft, then taken to the landing beaches and hand unloaded. Empire of Japan had built a base at Tulagi, a smaller island just to the north of Guadalcanal. The US Naval repaired and improved the base after it was captured. The Guadalcanal base were given the code names Bevy and Cactus, later renamed Mainyard. The codename Ringbolt was used for the attacks that took Florida Islands, Tulagi, Gavutu, and Tanambogo Islands. One of the reasons Guadalcanal was selected for amphibious landing, was on 20 June 1942 the US found Japan had begun building an airbase near Lungga Point. An airbase on Guadalcanal could attack the sea route from the United States to the US Naval Bases in Australia. The US putting an airbase on Guadalcanal could both protect the shipping lanes and put a check-attacks on Japan's large base at Rabaul in the northern Solomon Islands. Both the US troops and Japan's troops suffered from a lack of supplies during the Guadalcanal campaign. The US Naval would learn from the operation and improved the supply train to the fighting troops in the island hoping campaign.  The 6th Naval Construction Battalion arrived on August 10 from Naval Station Norfolk by way of Naval Base Espiritu Santo, 13 days after the first United States Marine Corps had landed. The Seabee found an incomplete 3,800-foot runway Japan's troops had started. The Seabees added 1,300-feet to the runway and paved it in Marston mat, due to the poor soil and rain. Work was stopped a few time due to bombing raids, sniping fire and shelling. When these had slowed down the Seabees were able to move out of foxholes and built a camp for the airfield and the Seabees. Seabees also built, a power station, a freshwater system for the camp and mess hall. For supplies, cargo ships unloaded into Higgins boats, tank lighters and pontoon barges, these were unloaded at the beach. Later, three timber piers were built at the beach for unloading.  A pier was also built at Lung Lagoon and was named Jennings landing in honor of Chief Ship fitter Jennings. Roads, bridges, and later fuel tank farms were built. The 6th Naval Construction Battalion was relieved by Naval Mobile Construction Battalion 26 on 5 January 1943. The 6th departed on the USS Hunter Liggett for R&R at Auckland in New Zealand. At Auckland the 6th did work on the camp at Victoria Park and at a US Navy Mobile Hospital there. The 6th departed Auckland to work at Naval Base Noumea 12 March 1943. The Construction Battalion 26 continued improving the base at Guadalcanal and built: gun mounts and emplacements, tunnels, 6,000 feet of railroad, multiple docks, over 35 miles of primary roadway, 10 bridges and two radio stations with 150-foot transmitter towers. Construction Battalion 26 departed 2 March 1944.  The 58th Naval Construction Battalion arrived on 12 December 1944. The 58th Naval Construction Battalion worked on the Solomons' Vella Lavella Island and Russell Island, and departed 11 March 1945. THe 14th Naval Construction Battalion worked at Guadalcanal from 4 November 1942 to 9 November 1943.  Naval Base at Guadalcanal Fleet Post Office (FPO#) was 145.

History 
After the Battle of Tulagi and Gavutu–Tanambogo in August 1942 Naval Bases were built by the 6th and 26th Seabees in the Solomons. At Tanambogo an airfield was built, Torokina Airfield. Landings at Cape Torokina called Operation Cherry Blossom took place on November 1, 1943. At Tulagi the Navy built a PT boat base and at the Florida Islands a seaplane base. The US bases built at the Solomon Islands worked to stop the Tokyo Express, the name given to Japan's supply line and reinforces from Rabaul to Guadalcanal. The US Navy Seabee built Naval Base, and airfields and help in the beach landing. At the end of World War II, with Victory over Japan Day the bases were closed. Some of the airfields became civilian airports.

Except for some troops left to build, garrison, operate, and defend the base at Tulagi, however, the majority of the U.S. Marines who had assaulted Tulagi and the nearby islets were soon relocated to Guadalcanal to help defend the airfield, later called Henderson Field by Allied forces, located at Lunga Point.

Solomon Islands Bases 
 Naval Base at Guadalcanal, FPO# 145
 Base at Torokina, Bougainville Island, FPO# 158, support of Torokina Airfield and PT Boat base
Naval Base Banika Island in the Russell Islands, PT boat base, FPO#  60, built after Operation Cleanslate
 Halavo Seaplane Base
Cape Torokina, Bougainville, runway built, PT boat base
 Base at Barakoma, Vella Lavella Island, FPO# 338, support of Barakoma Airfield, PT Boat base
 Base at San Cristobal Island, FPO# 3092 (Sea called Torpedo Alley)
 Base at Nissan Island, Northern Solomon Islands, FPO# 3202, support of Nissan Island Airfield
Seaplane Base Rekata Bay at Rekata Bay, Santa Isabel
Naval Base Treasury Islands
 Naval Base Treasury Islands, FPO# 811
 Stirling PT Boat Base in Blanche Harbor
Stirling Airfield, Coronus Strip, built by 87th Construction Battalion Seabees
Treasury Islands Seaplane Base unit VP-14 with Consolidated PBY Catalina

Naval Base Florida Islands

 Base at Tulagi, FPO# 152, PT boats and 20-bed dispensary
Tulagi Harbor base 
Tulagi Seaplane Base with unit VP-14 with Consolidated PBY Catalina
 Base at Gavutu Harbor, Nggela Islands,  FPO# 705, seaplane base 
Carter City at Mbolo, Bolo, Florida Islands, large Naval Supply and repair depot
  Makambo Island PT Boat base
 Palm Island tank farm

Naval Base New Georgia Islands
At New Georgia Islands a number of base wer built:
 Base at Seghe , New Georgia, FPO# 252, support of Segi Airfield
 Base at Munda, New Georgia FPO# 250 support of Munda Point Airfield
 Base at Rendova Island, off New Georgia, FPO# 251, PT Boat base
 Naval Base Lever Harbor, New Georgia, near Kukudu, Vaeimbu Harbour, PT boat  at 
 Base at Viru Harbor, New Georgia FPO# 254
 Rice Anchorage at Enogai
 Base at Sasavele Island, in Roviana Lagoon, FPO# 529, .
Base at Vila, Kolombangara Island, FPO# 627
Base at Ondonga, FPO# 626 to support Ondonga Airfield
Ondonga Seaplane Base with VP-14 and Consolidated PBY Catalina
 New Hebrides
The New Hebrides Islands are just south of the Solomons, as such are sometimes included in the Navy's list of Solomon bases:
Naval Base Espiritu Santo one of the largest bases of the war.

New Caledonia
The New Caledonia Islands are south of the Solomons, as such are sometimes included in the Navy's list of Solomon bases:
Naval Base Noumea a large base

Guadalcanal Airfields 
Built after the Battle for Henderson Field
Henderson Field (Lunga Point, Bomber 1, Honiara Airport)
 Henderson Field Fighter 1, called Lunga, abandoned
 Henderson Field Fighter 2, called Kukum, abandoned
Fighter 3, Emergency Field,  near the Tenaru River, abandoned
Crash Strip (The Grassy Strip)  located near Coffin Corner Bloody Ridge
Crash Strip Koli Point at Koli Point, near Carney Field and Koli Field
Carney Field, Bomber 2, near Koli Point and the Honiara's Metapona River
Koli Field (Bomber 3)  located near the Metapona River.

At Henderson Field, (Cactus Air Force), the US Navy had stationed:
VF-5 with Grumman F4F Wildcat
VC-40 with Douglas SBD Dauntless and TBF Avenger
VF-26 (F4F)
VF-27 (F4F)
VF-28 (F4F)
Carrier Air Wing Eleven (CAG 11)
VF-11 (VB-11) 1943
VT-11 (TBF Avenger) 1943
VB-21 (SBD) 1943
CASU-11 (Carrier Aircraft Service Unit 11) Feb 1943 – July 1944
VS-54 (SBD, and Vought OS2U Kingfisher) June 11, 1943 – August 3, 1944

At Carney Field the US Navy had stationed:
U.S. Navy (USN) units based at Carney flying Consolidated B-24 Liberator called PB4Y-1
VD-1
VB-106
VB-101
VB-102
VB-104

New Georgia Airfield 
 Ondonga Airfield, New Georgia, after the New Georgia campaign
At Ondonga Field the US Navy had stationed:
VF-17 with Vought F4U Corsair
VF-33 with Grumman F6F Hellcat
VP-12 with Consolidated PBY Catalina

Segi Airfield 
At Segi Field the US Navy had stationed:
47th Naval Construction Battalion (47th NCB) "Seabees", C Company
VF-38 F6F Hellcat
VF-40 F6F Hellcat
VF-33 F6F Hellcat

Naval Base Banika Island airfields
Built at Naval Base Banika Island. The airfields were used to attack the Japan on ew Georgia and Munda.
Banika Field, used by US Navy for Interstate TDR Assault Drones, United States Army Air Forces (USAAF) and United States Marine Corps
Renard Field used by USAAF and US Navy VB-140 and VB-148, both with  Lockheed Ventura PV-1
Renard Sound Seaplane Base, near Banika Field, in the channel to the east of the runway, the US Navy operated the Renard Sound Seaplane Base. The Base was at

Nissan Island Airfield
US Navy stationed at Nissan Island Airfield:
VPB-53 with PBY
Special Task Air Group One with Interstate TDR Assault Drones. Later depart to Banika

Operation Huddle 
Operation Huddle was the code name of the base planned for the base on Ndeni island, in the Santa Cruz islands group, about 250 miles (400 km) to the east of the Solomons islands. The plan was abandoned as the site had unfavorable terrain and there was cerebral malaria on the island.
After the Battle of the Santa Cruz Islands the island was used. While a land base was not built at Ndeni the USS McFarland a destroyer/seaplane tender supported a flying boat squadron of Consolidated PBY Catalina at Graciosa Bay Ndeni anchorage port. The floating base depart after defeat in the naval battle of Savo Island in August 1942. PBY Catalina returned to Ndeni for reconnaissance work during the naval Battle of the Eastern Solomons on 24 August 1942 and Battle of Santa Cruz Islands on 26 October 1942.

Tenders
Tenders that were stationed at Solomons:
USS McFarland (DD-237), destroyer converted to seaplane tender
USS George E. Badger (DD-196), destroyer converted to seaplane tender
USS Williamson (DD-244), destroyer converted to seaplane tender
USS Thornton (DD-270), destroyer converted to seaplane tender
USS Goldsborough (DD-188), destroyer converted to seaplane tender
USS Curtiss (AV-4), seaplane tender
USS Mackinac (AVP-13), seaplane tender
USS Chandeleur (AV-10), seaplane tender
USS Chincoteague (AVP-24), seaplane tender
USS Ballard (DD-267), seaplane tender
USS Coos Bay, seaplane tender
USS Dixie (AD-14), destroyer tender 
USS Rigel (AD-13), destroyer tender
USS Jamestown (PG-55), PT Boat tender
USS Varuna (AGP-5), PT Boat tender
USS Niagara (PG-52), PT Boat tender
USS Willoughby (AGP-9), PT Boat tender
USS Heron (AM-10), PT Boat tender
USS Alecto, PT Boat tender
USS Vestal, repair ship

Gallery

See also 

US Naval Advance Bases
Battle of the Eastern Solomons
Japanese occupation of the Solomon Islands
Naval Battle of Guadalcanal
Invasion of Tulagi (May 1942)
Battle of Savo Island
Eastern Solomons order of battle
Battle of the Tenaru
Battle of Tassafaronga
Bougainville campaign
US Naval Base New Zealand
Washing Machine Charlie

External links 
YouTube Seabees of World War II

References 

Military installations established in 1942
Closed installations of the United States Navy
1942 in the Solomon Islands